Budock Water (meaning church hillspur) is a village and former manor in the civil parish of Budock, Cornwall, England, United Kingdom. The village is situated two miles (3 km) west of Falmouth.

According to the 2001 census Budock parish had a population of 1,399. This had increased to 1,537 at the 2011 census.  The parish includes the smaller villages of Lamanva and Treverva and encompasses  of land. The hamlet of Mongleath is 
also in the parish. Arable farming in the parish includes early potatoes, broccoli and daffodils.

Amenities
Budock Water village has a public house called the Trelowarren Arms (known as the Trelly) and there is also a hotel in the parish (Penmorvah Manor) which has a restaurant that is open to non-residents. The Penmorvah was also known as a popular night club called "Manderley" and is opposite Penjerrick Garden which is open to the public on certain days of the week. The village had a post office until 2009 when it was closed following the central government review of rural post offices, but the shop remains as another hub for the village.  There is a regular bus service connecting the village with both Falmouth and Helston as well as the outlying villages in the area.

History and notable buildings
The historical name for the village of Budock Water was recorded as Roseglos in 1634 and Eglos-Rose in 1749, from the Cornish language ros (hillspur) and eglos (church).
The church of St Budock is recorded in Latin in 1208 as Ecclesia Sancti Budoci de Treliver (the Church of St Budock at Treliver), Seynt Buthek in 1449, Bythick in 1727, and in Cornish as Eglos Budock in 1769 and 1844. The parish is recorded in Cornish as Plu Vuthek (Budock's parish) circa 1400, and the Parish of Bewtheck by Penryn in 1466. In Latin it was known as Parochia Budoci Majoris (the parish of Budock Major) in 1349, this was to distinguish it from Budock Vean (Little Budock) in the neighbouring parish of Constantine. The church at Budock Vean was called Eglosbuthek byan in 1469, and Buthack vyan in 1574.

The earliest recorded rector of Budock was in 1207, although it is believed that the link to Budoc, a Celtic saint, dates back to 470 AD. The parish church, which has a western tower, is partly of the 13th and partly of the 15th century: the box pews which in most churches were removed in the Victorian period remained.  Falmouth was originally part of the parish of Budock. The church contains a monumental brass to John III Killigrew (d.1567) of Arwennack, Falmouth, the first Governor of Pendennis Castle and his wife Elizabeth Trewennard. Besides the parish church, the village also had a Wesleyan Methodist Chapel originally built around 1814, and rebuilt in 1843.  Declining congregations eventually resulted in this chapel being closed and sold, and that building was used as a meadery restaurant and is now a carvery. There is no longer an active Methodist Chapel at Treverva which was used by the famous Treverva Choir; they now practise at Penryn Rugby Club.

At Rosemerryn is a substantial house of about 1730. The Crag, Maenporth, was a house built by Alfred Waterhouse in 1865 incorporating some Cornish elements: subsequently a hotel, it burnt down in 1981.

There are two Cornish crosses in the parish; both are in the churchyard. There is also a cross base at Nangitha.

Education and social activities
The village school (a Church of England primary school) closed in 1990 when it was amalgamated with two other church schools. The original building was sold and converted into a private house.  Local children benefit from a playing field in the middle of the village, donated by a local landowner, equipped with swings and climbing frames.  There is a village hall that is used by clubs and organisations ranging from the toddlers group, quilters, bingo, a monthly luncheon club, yoga classes, a martial arts group, zumba sessions right up to the Over 60s Club.

Budock woods remains a popular wooded area adjoining the village. One area of the woods was noted to have a great many bluebell flowers, but these suffered after the great storms on 25 January 1990 that toppled many of the mature beech, oak and sweet chestnut trees that they were growing beneath. A jungle garden located at Penjerrick Garden is open to visitors on certain days.

Notable people
Tony Kellow would certainly rank as one of its most famous sons. He won the "Golden Boot" in 1980/81 for being the Football League's highest goal scorer in all four divisions. A memorial to him stands near the Trelowarren Arms and a shrine in his honour is in the pub where Tony was a very popular figure. He still holds the record for goals scored at Exeter City who sold him to Blackpool for a then record fee.

References

The Budock Parish History Group (1974) A Short Study of an Ancient Parish [Volume I].
The Budock Parish History Group (1993) A Short Study of an Ancient Parish Volume II.

External links

 Budock Parish official website

Villages in Cornwall
Falmouth, Cornwall